Preble County is a county located in the U.S. state of Ohio. As of the 2020 census, the population was 40,999, down 3.0% from the 2010 census population of 42,270. Its county seat is Eaton. The county was formed on February 15, 1808, from portions of Butler and Montgomery Counties. It is named for Edward Preble, a naval officer who fought in the American Revolutionary War and against the Barbary Pirates.

Geography

Adjacent counties
 Darke County (north)
 Montgomery County (east)
 Butler County (south)
 Union County, Indiana (southwest)
 Wayne County, Indiana (northwest)

Rivers and streams
 Little Four Mile Creek
 Harker's Run
 Seven Mile Creek
 Twin Creek
 Price Creek
 Goose Creek
 Pottinger Run

Demographics

2020 census
As of the 2020 United States Census, there were 40,999 living in the county. The racial makeup of the county was 94.8% white, 0.5% black or African American, 0.2% American Indian, 0.4% Asian, 0.0% Pacific Islander, 0.4% from other races, and 3.7% from two or more races. Those of Hispanic or Latino ethnicity made up 0.9% of the population.

2010 census
As of the 2010 United States Census, there were 42,270 people, 16,341 households, and 11,867 families living in the county. The racial makeup of the county was 97.6% white, 0.4% black or African American, 0.4% Asian, 0.2% American Indian, 0.2% from other races, and 1.2% from two or more races. Those of Hispanic or Latino origin made up 0.6% of the population. In terms of ancestry, 34.3% were German, 14.6% were Irish, 12.7% were American, and 11.5% were English.

Of the 16,341 households, 32.7% had children under the age of 18 living with them, 57.5% were married couples living together, 10.1% had a female householder with no husband present, 27.4% were non-families, and 23.2% of all households were made up of individuals. The average household size was 2.56 and the average family size was 2.99. The median age was 40.9 years.

The median income for a household in the county was $49,780 and the median income for a family was $57,711. Males had a median income of $46,383 versus $30,876 for females. The per capita income for the county was $23,290. About 6.3% of families and 9.4% of the population were below the poverty line, including 13.1% of those under age 18 and 6.8% of those age 65 or over.

2000 census
As of the census of 2000, there were 42,337 people, 16,001 households, and 12,144 families living in the county. The population density was 100 people per square mile (38/km2). There were 17,186 housing units at an average density of 40 per square mile (16/km2). The racial makeup of the county was 98.47% White, 0.32% Black or African American, 0.21% Native American, 0.26% Asian, 0.02% Pacific Islander, 0.11% from other races, and 0.60% from two or more races. 0.43% of the population were Hispanic or Latino of any race.

There were 16,001 households, out of which 34.20% had children under the age of 18 living with them, 63.50% were married couples living together, 8.50% had a female householder with no husband present, and 24.10% were non-families. 20.60% of all households were made up of individuals, and 8.90% had someone living alone who was 65 years of age or older. The average household size was 2.62 and the average family size was 3.02.

In the county, the population was spread out, with 26.00% under the age of 18, 7.70% from 18 to 24, 28.70% from 25 to 44, 24.40% from 45 to 64, and 13.20% who were 65 years of age or older. The median age was 38 years. For every 100 females there were 99.30 males. For every 100 females age 18 and over, there were 95.70 males.

The median income for a household in the county was $42,093, and the median income for a family was $47,547. Males had a median income of $35,313 versus $23,573 for females. The per capita income for the county was $18,444. About 4.50% of families and 6.10% of the population were below the poverty line, including 7.00% of those under age 18 and 6.10% of those age 65 or over.

Politics
Preble County votes for Republicans more often than Democrats in presidential elections. It only supported a Democrat for president five times in the 20th century, the last being Lyndon Johnson in 1964. Jimmy Carter is the last Democrat to tally as much as 40 percent of the vote.

|}

Education

Public school districts
 Eaton Community Schools
 Eaton High School, Eaton (the Eagles)
 National Trail Local School District
 National Trail High School, New Paris (the Blazers)
 Preble Shawnee Local School District
 Preble Shawnee High School, Camden (the Arrows)
 Tri-County North Local School District
 Tri-County North High School, Lewisburg (the Panthers)
 Twin Valley Community Local School District
 Twin Valley South High School, West Alexandria (the Panthers)
 Union County College Corner Joint School District (the Patriots)
 College Corner Union School (grades K-5) is physically located in both Ohio and Indiana (the state line runs through the middle of the building) and serves students from both College Corner, Ohio, and West College Corner, Indiana. After finishing fifth grade, Preble County students attend Union County Middle School and Union County High School, both located across the state line in Liberty, Indiana.

Higher education
 Sinclair Community College
 Preble County Learning Center, Eaton

Communities

City
 Eaton (county seat)

Villages

 College Corner
 Camden
 Eldorado
 Gratis
 Lewisburg
 New Paris
 Verona
 West Alexandria
 West Elkton
 West Manchester

Townships

 Dixon
 Gasper
 Gratis
 Harrison
 Israel
 Jackson
 Jefferson
 Lanier
 Monroe
 Somers
 Twin
 Washington

https://web.archive.org/web/20160715023447/http://www.ohiotownships.org/township-websites

Census-designated place
 Lake Lakengren

Unincorporated communities

 Brennersville
 Brinley
 Browns
 Campbellstown
 Cedar Springs
 Dadsville
 Ebenezer
 Enterprise
 Fairhaven
 Gettysburg
 Greenbush
 Hamburg
 Ingomar
 Morning Sun
 Muttonville
 New Hope
 New Lexington
 New Westville
 Sampleville
 Sugar Valley
 Talawanda Springs
 West Florence
 West Sonora
 Wheatville

Notable residents
 Sherwood Anderson - writer
 Victor J. Banis - "the godfather of modern popular gay fiction."
 Benjamin Hanby - wrote the Christmas carol "Up On The House Top" while living in Preble County.
 Andrew L. Harris - Civil War general and former governor of Ohio.
 William Stephens - former governor of California.

See also
 National Register of Historic Places listings in Preble County, Ohio
 Preble County District Library

References

External links
 Preble County Commissioners
 Eaton-Preble County Chamber of Commerce
 Preble County District Library
 Preble County Information Resource

Preble County, Ohio
1808 establishments in Ohio